Miss World 1985, the 35th edition of the Miss World pageant, was held on 14 November 1985 at the Royal Albert Hall in London, UK. 78 contestants from all over the world competed for the coveted title. Miss World 1984, Astrid Carolina Herrera of Venezuela, crowned Hólmfríður Karlsdóttir of Iceland as the new Miss World at the end of the event.

Results

Placements

Continental Queens of Beauty

Contestants

Judges
Ibrahim Keita
Graeme Souness
Ralph Halpern † 
Sarah-Jane Hutt – Miss World 1983
Eric Morley † 
Duncan Goodhew
Anne-Marie Moser
Tan Sri Jeyaratnam
Barry McGuigan

Notes

Debuts

Returns

Last competed in 1968:
 
Last competed in 1977:
 
Last competed in 1978:
  (as )
Last competed in 1983:

Withdrawals

Other Notes

 ''' This was the first time Iceland won Miss World

References

External links
 Pageantopolis – Miss World 1985

Miss World
1985 in London
1985 beauty pageants
Beauty pageants in the United Kingdom
Events at the Royal Albert Hall
November 1985 events in the United Kingdom